Acta Entomologica Serbica is a peer-reviewed scientific journal covering entomology published by the Entomological Society of Serbia. It publishes mainly original research papers.

The journal was established as Glasnik Entomološkog društva Kraljevine Srba, Hrvata i Slovenaca (Bulletin of the Entomological Society of the Kingdom of Serbs, Croats and Slovenes) in May 1926, then renamed to Glasnik Jugoslovenskog entomološkog društva (Bulletin of the Yugoslav Entomological Society) in 1929. It was re-established as Acta entomologica Jugoslavica in 1971 and obtained its current name in December 1996.

References

External links
 
 

Entomology journals and magazines
English-language journals
Biannual journals
Publications established in 1926
Academic journals published by learned and professional societies